The 1973 South Australian National Football League season was the 94th season of the top-level Australian rules football competition in South Australia.

Glenelg were the dominant team of the season. They lost only one game all season, to North Adelaide in Round 7.

Glenelg narrowly won the Grand Final against North Adelaide, 21-11 (137) to 19-16 (130). Graham Cornes famously took a mark and goaled to put them one point ahead in the final minutes, and they scored one more goal after the final siren to win by 7 points. It was their first premiership in 39 years.

Ladder

Finals Series

Grand Final

References 

SANFL
South Australian National Football League seasons